Lazy Bear is a Michelin starred restaurant in San Francisco, in the U.S. state of California.

The idea for Lazy Bear came to chef David Barzelay after a dinner party he threw was so successful, people kept talking about his food.  Until 2015, he did pop up, underground events before opening a brick and mortar location in the Mission District. The restaurant has two floors.  The top floor is for drinks, apéritifs and appetizers. Then they head downstairs for the rest of the meal.

See also 

 List of Michelin starred restaurants in San Francisco Bay Area

References 

Restaurants in San Francisco
Michelin Guide starred restaurants in California